Bourn Pond is a small lake located south-southwest of the hamlet of Treadwell in Delaware County, New York. The East Branch Handsome Brook flows through Bourn Pond.

See also
 List of lakes in New York

References 

Lakes of New York (state)
Lakes of Delaware County, New York